Locastra crassipennis is a species of snout moth in the genus Locastra. It was described by Francis Walker in 1857 and is known from Sarawak, Borneo and Silhet, Bangladesh.

References

Moths described in 1857
Epipaschiinae